Kura Puñusqa (Quechua kura priest, puñuy to sleep, -sqa a suffix, 'a priest who fell asleep', also spelled Cura Puñuskha) is a  mountain in the Bolivian Andes. It is located in the Potosí Department, José María Linares Province, Caiza "D" Municipality. The Jalsuri River originates near the mountain. Its waters flow to the Jatun Mayu.

References 

Mountains of Potosí Department